Karimanne is a village in the southern state of Karnataka, India. It is located in the Nelamangala taluk of Bangalore Rural district.

Demographics 
Karimanne had population of 451 of which 211 are males while 240 are females as per report released by Census India 2011.

Geography 
The total geographical area of village is 215.06 hectares.

Bus Route from Bengaluru City 
Yeshwantapura  - Nelamangala - Dabaspete

See also 

 Channohalli
 Bengaluru Rural District

References

External links 

Villages in Bangalore Rural district